Transport in Vijayawada is the network of roads, railways, rapid transit system in the second largest city of Andhra Pradesh. The city of Vijayawada also serves as the central hub of transport and logistics within the state. 

There are various modes of transportation available in Vijayawada. It includes auto rickshaws, bicycles to mass transit systems such as buses and trains.

Roadways 

M.G. Road and Eluru road are the main arterial roads of the city. Benz Circle is one of the busiest road junctions in the city with an average of 57,000 vehicles crossing daily, The junction has the intersection of two national highways of NH 16 and NH 65.

Public transport 
Bus Transit is the major mode of passenger transport in the city. PNBS is the major bus station in the city.  Vijayawada Bus Rapid Transit System was partially operational. APS RTC operates buses to major parts of the country and also operates Intercity transport (City Bus Services). Apart from these there are 3 Minor Bus stations namely, Autonagar bus station, KR market bus station & Ibrahimpatnam bus station.

There are close to 8,500 auto rickshaws operating in the city, and the number may be as high as 13,000 by including suburbs. To decrease the environmental impact, eco-friendly E-rickshaws were introduced in the city. The civic authority came up with an idea of women driven autos named as, She Autos.

Train Transit is the major mode of transportation in the city, as the city is a major transportation hub in India. The city of Vijayawada has several satellite stations such as,

Suburban and high speed rail 
A proposed circular train connectivity would connect Vijayawada with neighbouring cities of Guntur, Tenali, Mangalagiri and the state capital, Amaravati.

Airways 

Vijayawada Airport is located at Gannavaram, suburb of Vijayawada located at a distance of 20 km from the heart of the city. It had been given international status.

References 

 
Transport in Andhra Pradesh by city